Redrawing Nations: Ethnic Cleansing in East-Central Europe, 1944–1948 is a 2001 collection of essays edited by Philipp Ther and Ana Siljak which deals with the flight and expulsion of Germans during and after World War II.

References

2001 non-fiction books
History books about ethnic cleansing